Margaret Wolfson is an American branding executive, entrepreneur, and writer. The founder and chief creative officer of River and Wolf, a New York-based branding and brand naming agency, Wolfson began her career as a storyteller and performance artist.

Education
Wolfson was born to Esther (Evans) Wolfson and Lester Wolfson, a professor of literature who in 1969 became the first chancellor of Indiana University South Bend. She received a bachelor's degree from Indiana University's Independent Study Program, where she studied with poet Mary Ellen Solt and an M.A. from New York University's Gallatin School of Individualized Study with a focus on literature and communication arts.

Career

1982-2014: Performance
In the 1980s Wolfson founded Fire Plume Theater, a storytelling and music ensemble; a review in the Los Angeles Times described a 1989 performance as "dark and strange and brushed with eloquent melancholy" with Wolfson "creating images with words, silence and graceful body movements."   Later known as World Myth and Music, the ensemble toured throughout North America, Europe, and Asia with flutist Paula Chan Bing and other musicians, appearing at venues including the Sydney Opera House, the National Theater, the United Nations, and the Brooklyn Academy of Music in addition to museums and universities worldwide.

In 1999, Wolfson collaborated with composer Michael Ching  to create Psyche and Eros, which premiered with the San Jose Chamber Orchestra in 2000. A later version of the work was performed at the Abu Dhabi Festival and the Lincoln Center Summer Institute program in West Memphis.  Wolfson also collaborated with composer/musician Simon Shaheen on two theatrical events: Majnun Layla in 1989  and The Epic of Gilgamesh in 2011. Majnun Layla  premiered at the Kennedy Center's Terrace Theater.

1996-2011: Workshops and writing
Between 1996 and 2001, Wolfson wrote four illustrated books based on folklore and myths, including Marriage of the Rain Goddess: A South African Myth.  "A flowing, incantatory text, inspired by a fragment of a Zulu myth, is encrusted with poetic epithets,"  it was published by Barefoot Books in 1996. Danish, Korean, and Swedish translations were later published. The Patient Stone: A Persian Love Story, released in 2001, was also published by Barefoot Books.'

Wolfson held storytelling residences and led workshops in the US as well as in the United Arab Emirates.  She was a consultant for The Bushnell Center for the Performing Arts, and the director of the Myth Project at CalArts.

2008-present:  Naming, River and Wolf
Although she continued to perform, Wolfson became a brand naming and creative consultant for the naming agency Namebase in 2008; the New York Times noted that she "split her time between naming and performing one-woman shows around the world in which she recites classical myths."  In 2014, she founded her own naming agency, River and Wolf.  She has since created brand names for companies including Calvin Klein,  Maison Ferrand,  Micro Medical Instruments, Philips and Samsung and developed product names for the technology, financial services, entertainment, food and beverage and consumer packaged goods industries.

Wolfson is frequently interviewed on subjects related to branding, marketing, and naming.  She has been quoted in publications ranging from AdAge  to New York Magazine, Fast Company   and the Wall Street Journal.  In 2021, she launched Names of Distinction, a digital gallery that highlights brand names and offers naming tips and techniques.

Bibliography
The Turtle Tattoo: Timeless Tales for Finding and Fulfilling Your Dreams; Nataraj Publications, January 1996 
Marriage of the Rain Goddess: A South African Myth; illustrations by Clifford Alexander Parms; Barefoot Books; January 1999; 
Turtle Songs: A Tale for Mothers and Daughters; illustrations by Karla Sachi; ‎ Beyond Words Publishing Company,  January 1999; 
The Patient Stone: A Persian Love Story; illustrations by Juan Caneba Clavero;  ‎ Barefoot Books; January 2001;

References

External links
 River and Wolf
 Margaret Wolfson

American storytellers
Women storytellers
American performance artists
20th-century American writers
21st-century American writers
Year of birth missing (living people)
Living people
New York University alumni
21st-century American women writers
20th-century American women writers
Branding consultants
American marketing businesspeople